The Downtown Sterling Historic District, in Sterling, Colorado, is a  historic district which was listed on the National Register of Historic Places in 2013.

It included 54 contributing buildings and was roughly bounded by Division Ave., Poplar, Front, Ash and 4th Sts.

It includes a city hall, a courthouse, and a theatre.

It includes the Logan County Courthouse, which is separately listed on the National Register.

References

Historic districts on the National Register of Historic Places in Colorado
National Register of Historic Places in Logan County, Colorado

Late 19th and Early 20th Century American Movements architecture
Sterling, Colorado